César Alberto Ibáñez Jiménez (born 1 April 1992) is a Mexican professional footballer for C.D. Irapuato in the Liga Premier de México.

Club career
Considered one of the best young Mexican players. On 8 November 2008 César made his 1st division debut at the age of 16 in a 2–1 win over Monarcas Morelia. Oddly, he had only played one game in the 2nd Division of Mexican football. On 29 April 2010 scouts from Spanish team Real Valladolid wanted him to join the club's B team. Ibáñez declined the offer for a move to Spain, choosing to stay with Atlas. on Apertura 2011 he will play with the Mexican club Santos Laguna on loan.

International career
He has been called up to the Mexico U-17 team. César was a starter on the Mexico U-17 team that beat the Brazil U-17 team at the 2009 FIFA U-17 World Cup.

Honours
Santos Laguna
Liga MX: Clausura 2012, Clausura 2015
Copa MX: Apertura 2014
Campeón de Campeones: 2015

Mexico Youth
CONCACAF U-20 Championship: 2011
Pan American Games: 2011
Toulon Tournament: 2012

References

External links
 
 
 
 

1992 births
Living people
Mexican footballers
Mexico youth international footballers
Mexico under-20 international footballers
Atlas F.C. footballers
Santos Laguna footballers
Atlético San Luis footballers
Correcaminos UAT footballers
Deportivo CAFESSA Jalisco footballers
Liga MX players
Ascenso MX players
Liga Premier de México players
Tercera División de México players
Association football midfielders
Footballers at the 2011 Pan American Games
Footballers from Guadalajara, Jalisco
Pan American Games gold medalists for Mexico
Pan American Games medalists in football
Medalists at the 2011 Pan American Games